Sayada is the name of:

 Sayada, Algeria, a town in Algeria.
 Sayada, Tunisia, a town in Tunisia.